Neocollyris saundersi is a species of ground beetle of the genus Neocollyris of the subfamily Carabinae. It was described by Chaudoir in 1864.

References

Saundersi, Neocollyris
Beetles described in 1864